A70 or A-70 may refer to:

 A70 road (Great Britain), a major road in the United Kingdom
 Autovía A-70, a Spanish motorway
 Benoni Defense, in the Encyclopaedia of Chess Openings
 Bundesautobahn 70, a German motorway also called A 70
 Quebec Autoroute 70, a Canadian highway in the Saguenay region of central Quebec
 Samsung Galaxy A70, smartphone released in 2019
 The third generation of the Toyota Supra

See also 
 List of highways numbered 70